PaskonAPO is the twelfth studio album of the Filipino trio Apo Hiking Society. It's an 11-track Christmas album released in 1991, under Universal Records.  15 years later, the cd was re-released and digitally remastered in 2006 with a new cover.

Track listing
 "Paskong Walang Pera" - 03:53
 "12 Days of Pinoy Krismas" - 03:43
 "Pasko Na Sinta Ko, Miss Kita Kung Christmas" - 05:41
 "Sanggol Na Mahiwaga" - 03:49
 "Himig ng Pasko" - 03:33
 "Pasko Na sa Mundo" - 03:20
 "Panahon ng Pag-ibig" - 04:19
 "Pasko Na" - 03:37
 "Lata ang Aming Tambol" - 03:06
 "Tuloy Na Tuloy Pa Rin ang Pasko" - 02:39
 "Ang Pasko" - 03:32

References

Related links
The Official Apo Hiking Society Website 
PaskonAPO on Amazon

APO Hiking Society albums
1991 albums